Jacqueline Dupuy (born 9 July 1994) is an Australian rules footballer playing for the Gold Coast Football Club in the AFL Women's (AFLW).

Football career 
Dupuy played football in Cairns and moved to the Sunshine Coast to play for Maroochydore to further her career opportunities. She made her AFLW debut for the Suns in round 1 of the 2022 AFL Women's season and kicked her first AFLW goal in round 2.

References

External links 

1994 births
Living people
Gold Coast Football Club (AFLW) players
Australian rules footballers from Queensland